The Illinois Department of Agriculture is the code department of the Illinois state government that regulates various facets of the agriculture industries of Illinois, oversees Illinois soil and water conservation, supervises the weights and measures of various commodity products, including gasoline, and supervises the Illinois State Fair. Agriculture industries that are supervised include the production of livestock, the growing of commodity crops such as corn and soybeans, and the regulation of grain elevators.

Governor Bruce Rauner accepted the resignation of Agriculture Director Phil Nelson on September 25, 2015, effective 30 days later. State Fair Director Patrick Buchen resigned the same day, telling The State Journal-Register, "I resigned because they fired (Nelson), and it's just a bunch of bull crap." Rauner appointed former State Representative Raymond Poe to the position in November of that year.

Governor J. B. Pritzker appointed Jerry Costello II as the Director of Agriculture on February 28, 2020.

References

External links
Illinois Department of Agriculture

Agriculture
State departments of agriculture of the United States